Shades of Jade  is a studio album by American jazz acoustic bassist Marc Johnson. The record was released on September 17, 2005 via ECM Records label. It was Johnson's first release on ECM since 1987. Saxophonist Joe Lovano, guitarist John Scofield and pianist Eliane Elias are amongst the players.

Reviews 
The album's title has biographical significance. Marc Johnson first came to the attention of players and listeners around the world as the bassist of Bill Evans' last great piano trio, between 1978 and 1980. The title track of the album, "Shades of Jade," was inspired by legendary Scott La Faro's "Jade Visions", first featured on Sunday at the Village Vanguard, in which he provided a lesson in how intensity can be focused in inward-looking music. On Shades of Jade you get a treat of engaging and sensual, lyrical and swinging music. It reaped praise far and wide. The New York Times enthused over the "luminescence" created by the close partnership between Elias and Johnson, while The Village Voice said the album was "shimmering" yet its "lusciousness has all sorts of tensile strength."

All About Jazz'''s critique John Kelman, in his review of Shades of Jade stated: "Some would argue that it's impossible to call a recording classic until sufficient time has passed to determine its true staying power. Still, one can say that a recording has the makings of a classic—especially in its ability to be simultaneously of its time and timeless..." Mike Shanly in his review for JazzTimes wrote, "In fact, Elias could almost be the de facto leader of the session." Jeff Simon of The Buffalo News noted "When you hear the gorgeous, summer-afternoon trance tune that gives the disc its title, you'll know how very much about beauty Johnson learned as the bassist for both Bill Evans and Stan Getz, once upon a time... A gorgeous disc."

BBC music critique Peter Marsh wrote: "...But it's the ballads (and especially Elias's poised, emotionally charged soloing) that stay in the memory long after the CD's finished. While this music might not change your world, it'll feel like a better place while you're listening to it. That can't be bad." The Guardian reviewer awarded the album four stars.

 Track listing All pieces by Marc Johnson (1, 3, 5, 7-8) and Eliane Elias (1-4, 6, 9).''

"Ton Sur Ton" (5:55)
"Apareceu" (6:04)
"Shades of Jade" (7:40)
"In 30 Hours" (6:10)
"Blue Nefertiti" (7:14)
"Snow" (8:24)
"Since You Asked" (3:18)
"Raise" (6:35)
"All Yours" (4:11)
"Don't Ask of Me" (5:13)

Personnel
Marc Johnson – double bass
Joe Lovano – tenor saxophone (all except 6-7, 10)
John Scofield – guitar (1, 3, 5, 8)
Eliane Elias – piano (all except 7, 10)
Joey Baron – drums
Alain Mallet – organ (8, 10)

References

External links 

2005 albums
ECM Records albums
Marc Johnson (musician) albums